Armando Coroneaux Isidoro (born 2 July 1985) is a Cuban international footballer who plays for the Cuba national football team.

CLub career
Coroneaux has played his entire career for Camagüey and scored 100 league goals for the club.

International career
He made his international debut for Cuba in a February 2008 friendly match against Guyana and has earned a total of 22 caps, scoring 4 goals. He represented his country in 1 FIFA World Cup qualifying matches. He scored a brace against Panama in only his fourth international game.

He was called up to the Cuba team for the 2015 CONCACAF Gold Cup. He played in Cuba's opening game against Mexico, a 6–0 loss.

International goals
Scores and results list Cuba's goal tally first.

Personal life
Coroneaux was born in Nuevitas, one of 6 children of Armando Coroneaux Coroneaux and Anairi Isidoro Matos.

References

External links
 
 

1985 births
Living people
Cuban footballers
Cuba international footballers
Association football forwards
FC Camagüey players
2013 CONCACAF Gold Cup players
2015 CONCACAF Gold Cup players
People from Nuevitas